This is a list of mayors of Lethbridge, Alberta, Canada.

Notes and references 

List
History of Lethbridge
Lethbridge, Alberta